The Black Diamond Mines Regional Preserve is a  park located north of Mount Diablo in Contra Costa County, California under the administration of the East Bay Regional Park District (EBRPD). The district acquired the property in 1973. The preserve contains relics of 3 mining towns, former coal and sand mines, and offers guided tours of a former sand mine. The  of trails in the Preserve cross rolling foothill terrain covered with grassland, California oak woodland, California mixed evergreen forest, and chaparral.

History

Natural History

Indigenous People 
Long before the widespread ranching and mining activity that took place in the area, indigenous people had a presence in the Bay Area for 13,000 years.  Three Bay Miwok tribes, the Chupcan, Ompin, and Volvon, lived in the areas surrounding the Black Diamond Mines Regional Preserve.  The Chupcan occupied territory to the west of the preserve near Concord, the Volvon occupied the territory to the south including much of Mount Diablo, and the Ompin occupied the area to the north including Pittsburg, Collinsville, and the intervening waterway.  Black Diamond Mines Regional Preserve is located in a boundary area between these three tribes.  At the beginning of the 19th century, these three tribes were significantly impacted by the Spanish mission system. Between 1804 and 1806, the majority of Volvon Bay Miwok were split up and baptized at either Mission Dolores or Mission San Jose. A Spanish military raid caused the Chupcans to flee to Suisun territory in 1804, and by 1811, most Chupcans were split up and baptized at either Mission Dolores or Mission San Jose. In 1810, some members of the Ompin went to Mission Dolores, and the remaining members went to Mission San Jose in the years 1811 and 1812.

Geology 
The rich coal deposits and sandstone hills of Black Diamond Mines Regional Preserve were formed by geological activity in the Tertiary period. In the period between the Paleocene epoch and Miocene epoch of the Tertiary era, the North American Plate and the Pacific plate came together at a subduction zone where the North American Plate was pushed over the Pacific Plate.  During this era, the Pacific Ocean stretched over much of the California central valley with the coastline reaching the lower regions of the Sierra Nevada mountains. Tectonic activity between the North American and Pacific plate, along with sea level changes, brought about four series of marine sediment deposition. The coal that was mined from the Mount Diablo Coal Field was formed during the third marine sediment deposition cycle which took place during the middle of the Eocene epoch. At the beginning of this third cycle, tectonic activity caused an uplift of the continental shelf seafloor, resulting in the creation of shallow marshes.  Erosion during this era brought an abundance of sediment into the shallow sea covering the continental shelf, with some sediment making its way into the marshlands.  These sediments, along with the favorable hot and humid climate, fueled the growth of coastal marsh flora that eventually formed into coal. Tectonic activity towards the end of this sedimentation cycle caused the continental shelf to sink and resulted in sediments being deposited into deeper water.  The Mount Diablo Mountain Range of today was created at the beginning of the fourth depositional cycle when the continental shelf began to rise up once again.

Mount Diablo Coalfield

In 1859 William C. Israel discovered a coal deposit while clearing out a spring on his land at Horse Haven Valley, six miles south of Antioch. His initial attempt to mine the coal was not financially successful but soon other coal deposits were discovered nearby and mining operations grew rapidly. The area became known as the Mount Diablo Coalfield, the largest in California, producing more than 400 million short tons (357 million long tons) of coal during this time.

The area includes the remains of twelve coal mines and the sites of several long-gone coal mining towns. The largest and oldest town, Nortonville, had a peak population of about 1,000. Somersville, Stewartville, West Hartley and Judsonville were located in valleys to the east. The sites of Judsonville and West Hartley are located on private property outside the eastern boundary of the Preserve. The mines were the Empire, Central, Star, Corcoran, Pittsburg, Manhattan, Eureka, Independent, Union, Black Diamond, Mt. Hope, and Cumberland. The  coal produced was of a low grade (sub-bituminous or lignite), but for a time in the 19th century, was the only readily accessible and economic source in California. Therefore, it was a very valuable resource and powering the railroads, ships and heavy industry of California. The mineral was often called 'black diamond."

The coal was carried to the San Joaquin River by three railroads: the Empire, Pittsburg, and Black Diamond, for shipment by barge to markets in San Francisco, Sacramento, Stockton and other communities. Coal mining activity ended as better-quality imported coal became affordable and as petroleum emerged as an energy source. After the coal mines closed, the towns were abandoned and the area was used mainly for cattle grazing. In 1974 the Southport Land and Commercial Company (former Black Diamond Coal Mining Company) donated 160 acres of its land holdings to help It become Black Diamond Mines Regional Park.

The coal mines are closed due to hazards posed by the age of the mines, the gases they produce (carbon dioxide and methane), and their rock quality (the shale and coal in the mines is unstable). In 1980 four young boys from the local area were killed by the methane gas from one of the open mines. However, a number of mine openings have been turned into public-access openings which allow visitors to look into the mines and, for some, to walk a short distance underground. The deepest public-access opening is known as Prospect Tunnel. Visitors can enter  of this excavation made by miners searching for coal.

Rose Hill Cemetery

Rose Hill Cemetery, officially designated as a Protestant cemetery, the final resting place for over 200 residents of the coalfield, is located on a hillside between the Somersville and Nortonville townsites. After the mines closed and the nearby towns were abandoned, the cemetery fell into disuse. Many of the gravestones were stolen or destroyed by vandals. In 1960, Ansel Adams photographed two Italian Cypress trees in the cemetery, and called the image, "Poplars, Cemetery near Mount Diablo".  The photo was taken with a Polaroid camera, though it's possible that it was not a typical consumer camera model.

The land the cemetery occupies was originally owned by the Black Diamond Coal Mining Company and was given to Contra Costa County by Emma Rose, the daughter of Black Diamond Mining Company president Alvinza Hayward. The original records for the cemetery were destroyed in the 1906 San Francisco earthquake and fire.

Few people buried in the cemetery are identified. Many of the individual plots were never marked. More had only a wooden marker – nearly all of which were destroyed over the years by either wildfires that swept through the area or by insects, weather, or other natural cause. Vandals are said to have carried off some of the more permanent stone markers.

A few whose earthly remains were laid to rest here include:
 William Gething, age 36, who was killed with 9 other men in an 1876 explosion; 7 other men who died at the same time are buried nearby.
 Sarah Norton, age 68, wife of Noah Norton (namesake of Nortonville), who also worked as a midwife and was killed instantly when she was thrown from her buggy to deliver yet another baby; she reportedly delivered over 600 babies for miners' wives.
 The earliest stone marker belongs to Elizabeth Richmond, who died in February, 1865.
 The youngest known person was the one-day-old, unnamed daughter of Thomas H. and Elizabeth Jenkins, who died on April 15, 1880.
 The oldest known person was Ruth French, age 81, died on September 11, 1874.
 The most recent known burial was William T. Davis, died in 1954.

Sandstone mine

In the 1920s, a mine producing high-quality silica sandstone was started by owner Marvin Greathouse on a hillside above the Somersville townsite. He sold the product to the Hazel-Atlas Glass Company which operated a plant in Oakland manufacturing glass containers. Hazel-Atlas eventually purchased the mine and operated it until about 1945. Another sandstone mine in the Nortonville area produced sand used by the Columbia Steel mill in Pittsburg, California for steel casting. The Hazel-Atlas mine is being restored and maintained by park staff and can be visited on guided tours which cover the area's mining history and geology.

Inside the Greathouse portal, a -long section of the entrance corridor has been made into a museum. The first section is a series of self-guided exhibits, while the larger second section (which has a separate entrance from the outside), houses a reconstruction of the Hazel-Atlas works as it would have appeared around 1940.

EBRPD originally repurposed the Hazel-Atlas mine as a museum in the 1970s, but storm damage in 2007 forced closure of this attraction for extensive repairs. It did not reopen for five years.

Recreation
The trails offer views of Mount Diablo, the Sacramento-San Joaquin River Delta, and on clear days, the Sierra Nevada.

The Preserve usually has an impressive variety of wildflowers in spring including the rare Mount Diablo fairy lantern (Calochortus pulchellus), Mount Diablo sunflower (Helianthella castanea), and Brewer's dwarf flax (Hesperolinon breweri). It is home to a variety of wildlife including deer, mountain lions, coyotes, foxes, bobcats, golden eagles, and a variety of hawks. The endangered San Joaquin kit fox (Vulpes macrotis mutica) and threatened California red-legged frog (Rana draytonii), California tiger salamander (Ambystoma californiense) and Alameda whipsnake (Masticophis lateralis) are present as well. The park is open year-round for hiking, mountain biking, and horseback riding from 8 am to dusk. A backpack camp and a group camp can be reserved for overnight stays.  There have been many reports of a ghost in the park.

2016 land donation
The property had been deeded to the holding company by Gordon Grevelle, president of Suncrest Homes, who had originally planned to build a gated residential community there when he had bought the tract in 1987. After going through an extensive permitting process and a decline in the California housing market, Grevelle decided that the project he had envisioned would be unlikely to meet his financial goals. Since the tract was already surrounded by park land, he chose to make the land available to EBRPD, which announced its intention to add the land to the Black Diamond Mines Regional Preserve. Grevelle estimated the market value of his donation at $3.5 million in 2016.

Notes

See also
National Register of Historic Places listings in Contra Costa County, California
List of California Historical Landmarks
sandstone

References

Further reading
Parent, T. 2009. Images of America: Black Diamond Mines Regional Preserve. Arcadia Publishing Company, Charleston, South Carolina, USA
http://www.ebparks.org/stewardship/wildlife
https://web.archive.org/web/20110911025638/http://www.ebparks.org/stewardship/plants
 National Park Service. Black Diamond Mines Regional Preserve. National Register of Historic Places Registration Form. 1991. Accessed February 22, 2017.

External links 

 East Bay Regional Parks.org: official Black Diamond Mines Regional Preserve website
 Ghosttowns.com: Nortonville

East Bay Regional Park District
Parks in Contra Costa County, California
Mining museums in California
Museums in Contra Costa County, California
Open-air museums in California
Coal mining in the United States
Mining in California
Antioch, California
Mount Diablo
Ghost towns in California
History of Contra Costa County, California
California Historical Landmarks
Historic districts on the National Register of Historic Places in California
Industrial buildings and structures on the National Register of Historic Places in California
National Register of Historic Places in Contra Costa County, California
Parks on the National Register of Historic Places in California
Populated places on the National Register of Historic Places in California
Protected areas established in 1973
1973 establishments in California
Sandstone in the United States
Sand mining